Eupselia aristonica is a species of moth of the family Depressariidae. It is found in Australia, where it has been recorded from New South Wales, the Australian Capital Territory, Victoria and Tasmania.

The wingspan is about 15 mm. The forewings are very dark fuscous, almost black with a square white spot on the inner-margin near the base, anteriorly somewhat suffused, its upper anterior angle connected with two short suffused white streaks, one running to the centre of the base, the other to the costa near the base, followed by a few scattered whitish scales. There is a small rectangular white spot on the middle of the costa, divided into two by a transverse dark fuscous line, each half giving rise to a leaden-blue metallic line, proceeding parallel directly across the wing. There is a leaden-blue metallic spot before them on the inner-margin and a leaden-blue metallic line from the middle of the disc immediately beyond them to the anal angle, interrupted beneath its apex. Beyond this line are thickly strewn very fine longitudinal whitish hair-scales and there is a very small white spot on the costa before the apex, giving rise to a short outwardly oblique leaden-metallic line, and with a small leaden-metallic spot beneath it. The extreme apex is ochreous-orange and there are four circular black spots on the lower half of hind-margin, surrounded by a few pale ochreous scales, the uppermost spot small. A violet-metallic line is found along the hind-margin on the base of the cilia, the rest of the cilia is dark fuscous. The hindwings are blackish-fuscous.

The larvae are thought to feed on the foliage of Eucalyptus species.

References

External links
Taxonomy

Eupselia
Moths of Australia
Moths described in 1880
Taxa named by Edward Meyrick